Isaac Deschamps (c. 1722 – 11 August 1801) was a Canadian judge, and politician.

Born in Switzerland or England, Deschamps came to Nova Scotia in 1749. He participated in the Bay of Fundy Campaign (1755) at Fort Edward to remove the Acadians. He was elected to the Nova Scotia House of Assembly for 1759 to 1760 for Annapolis County and represented Falmouth Township from 1761 to 1770 and Newport Township from 1770 to 1783. In 1761, he was appointed judge of the Inferior Court of Common Pleas and judge of probate for Kings County. In 1783 he was appointed to the Nova Scotia Council.  From 1785 to 1788, he was the Chief Justice of the Nova Scotia Supreme Court.  He is buried in the Old Parish Burying Ground (Windsor, Nova Scotia).

References

1720s births
1801 deaths
Year of birth uncertain
Colony of Nova Scotia judges
Nova Scotia pre-Confederation MLAs